Wuxing may refer to:

Places in China

Counties and districts
Huzhou, formerly Wuxing County, Zhejiang, China
Wuxing District (吴兴区), central district of Huzhou

Subdistricts (五星街道)
Wuxing Subdistrict, Mudanjiang, in Dong'an District, Mudanjiang, Heilongjiang 
Wuxing Subdistrict, Xinyang, in Shihe District, Xinyang, Henan
Wuxing subdistrict, Xi'an, in Chang'an District, Xi'an, Shaanxi
Wuxing, Jiangsu, in Zhonglou District, Changzhou, Jiangsu
Wuxing, Yancheng, Jiangsu, in Tinghu District, Yancheng, Jiangsu

Towns (五星镇)
Wuxing, Anhui, in Taihe County, Anhui
Wuxing, Xinye County, in Xinye County, Henan

Townships (五星乡)
Wuxing Township, Anhui, in Xuanzhou District, Xuancheng, Anhui
Wuxing Township, Henan, in Puyang County, Henan 
Wuxing, Sichuan, a township in Xingwen County, Yibin, Sichuan 
Wuxing, Yunnan, in Huize County, Yunnan

Other
Wuxing (Chinese philosophy), a concept in Chinese philosophy
Wuxing (text) (五行), a Chinese "Warring States" text
Five Animals ("Five Forms") (五形), a kind of Chinese martial arts
Five Punishments (五刑), a series of physical penalties in dynastic China
Wuxing (c. 630) Chinese monk who travelled to India and mentioned by Yijing, died in Northern India.

See also
Flag of China, or the "Five-starred red flag" (五星红旗)
Five star (disambiguation), or Wuxing (五星)